NGC 395 is an open cluster located in the constellation Tucana. It was discovered on August 1, 1826 by James Dunlop. It was described by Dreyer as "very faint, pretty large, round, gradually a little brighter middle."

References

0395
18260801
Tucana (constellation)
Open clusters